In probability theory, a telescoping Markov chain (TMC) is a vector-valued stochastic process that satisfies a Markov property and admits a hierarchical format through a network of transition matrices with cascading dependence.

For any  consider the set of spaces . The hierarchical process  defined in the product-space

 

is said to be a TMC if there is a set of transition probability kernels  such that

  is a Markov chain with transition probability matrix 
 
 there is a cascading dependence in every level of the hierarchy,
       for all 
  satisfies a Markov property with a transition kernel that can be written in terms of the 's,

 where  and 

Markov processes